Ca. lykkelig was a Norwegian sitcom that was broadcast on TV 2.

Plot
The series was about three more or less successful couples in their 30s. The cast consisted of three couples: Ivar Nergaard as Aksel and Linn Skåber as Liv; Arvid Ones as Arne and Siv Charlotte Klynderud as Kirsti; Tore Chr. Sævold as Karsten and Jasmin Aasland as Lotte.

Aftenposten gave the sitcom a mediocre review. Linn Skåber received attention for her role. After 13 episodes the show was deemed to be successful, and TV 2 signalized that a second season was to be made. Some months later it was decided to stop the show, after Linn Skåber pursued other projects.

References

External links
 

TV 2 (Norway) original programming
2000 Norwegian television series debuts
2000 Norwegian television series endings
Norwegian television sitcoms